The 1918 House election in Wyoming was held on November 5, 1918. Incumbent Republican Congressman Frank Wheeler Mondell ran for re-election to a twelfth term in the U.S. House of Representatives. He was opposed by Democratic nominee Hayden M. White, the former Johnson County Prosecuting Attorney and the 1908 Democratic nominee for Congress. Owing in large part to the Republican landslide in 1918, Mondell handily defeated White to win re-election.

Democratic primary

Candidates
 Hayden M. White, former Johnson County Prosecuting Attorney, 1908 Democratic nominee for Congress

Results

Republican primary

Candidates
Frank Wheeler Mondell, incumbent U.S. Congressman

Results

General election

Results

References 

Wyoming
1918
1918 Wyoming elections